Sankt Märgen (Low Alemannic: Sankt Märge) is a German municipality in the middle of the Black Forest, which belongs to the district of Breisgau-Hochschwarzwald. The Kurort (spa town) is located around 25 km north of Freiburg im Breisgau.

Geography

Geographical location
Sankt Märgen is located on a mountain spur.  The village territory extends from the Thurner Plateau in the south to the eastern foothills of Kandel to the north, which are between 570 and 1132 meters high.  To the east and west its boundaries are marked by deep valleys.

Municipal Arrangement
Around half the residents live in the village proper. The rest live across the surrounding countryside.

History
Between 1115 and 1118 the Augustinian monastery of Maria-Zell auf dem Schwarzwald was established by Count Bruno von Haigerloch-Wiesneck, Chancellor of Henry V and Provost of Straßburg, as competition to the Zähringen-founded Benedictine monastery of St. Peter auf dem Schwarzwald.  The town and the monastery were dependent upon each other for many years.  In 1716 a two-steepled Baroque monastery church was built, and the life of the community underwent a revival, until 1806 when the monastery was given up.

Politics

Mayors
1977-1993 Manfred Holzmann (CDU)
1993-today: Josef Waldvogel (CDU)

Sister cities
Erdeven, southern Brittany, France, since 1997

References

Much of the information in this article is based on and translated from that found in its German equivalent.

External links
 The Town of Erdeven
  St. Märgen:History and images

Spa towns in Germany
Breisgau-Hochschwarzwald
Baden